Tere Bin Laden is a 2010 Indian satire comedy film produced by Walkwater Media and written and directed by Abhishek Sharma. An ambitious young Pakistani reporter, who, in his desperation to migrate to the United States, makes a fake Osama bin Laden video using a look-alike, and sells it to TV channels. Osama bin Laden was played by Pradhuman Singh. The film is a spoof on Osama Bin Laden as well as a comic satire on America's war against terror and the realities of the post-9/11 world. The film was released worldwide, except the United States and Pakistan, on 16 July 2010.

A sequel, Tere Bin Laden: Dead or Alive, was released in 2016.

Plot
Ali Hassan is a reporter with Danka TV, a downmarket local TV channel in Karachi, Pakistan. He is keen to migrate to the US for a better life and wants to work for an American news channel. He gets a chance to fly to the US, but ruins it on board while filming his own audition. He recites the words "Hijack" and "Bomb" too many times; thus scaring his fellow passengers and flight crew. As soon as he reaches the United States, he is deported. Furthermore, because of this incident his visa application is rejected six times in seven years. While covering a local event for his channel, he comes across an Osama Bin Laden look-alike, Noora, and hits upon an idea to make a fake Osama tape. He manages to convince his assistant Gul about the merits of his plan. With help from his travel agent's assistant Zoya and a local radio jockey Qureshi, he is able to make the tape by tricking Noora into unknowingly posing as Bin Laden. He then sells the tape to the owner of his channel, hoping to raise money for a new false identity, a new passport and a renewed attempt at getting the elusive US visa. However, the gravity of their action strikes them when the US Government takes the tape seriously and gets involved, as do the Pakistani intelligence agencies. Noora, too, realises the trick played upon him and hides in his house.

Ali decides to defuse the situation by making another tape in which Osama would be declaring ceasefire with US. He manages to convince Noora and Qureshi. During the shooting of the tape in Danka TV studio, Noora unwittingly detonates a grenade, which kills his beloved prize rooster. Depressed, Noora runs away from the location with the Osama-makeup still on, forcing Ali and his team to follow suit. They manage to get hold of Noora and try to convince him for another shoot. Meanwhile, the FBI team, led by Ted Wood and Usman, head of the Pakistani intelligence agency tracks down the location of Ali and his team. The police arrests Noora, Ali and his team. Ted is delirious that he could at last catch Osama bin Laden. However, during the interrogation, the truth is revealed and to save Ted's face, Ali convinces him about his idea of making a tape of Osama declaring ceasefire. The film ends with US accepting the offer of ceasefire and Ted getting elected as Defence Secretary. Ali is, at last, able to make it to the US and Noora too changes his lifestyle, marries Zoya and helps her with the daily routine in her beauty parlor. Usman is shown to be admitted in a mental hospital as he tries to tell the truth to the world.

Cast
 Ali Zafar as Ali Hassan
 Pradhuman Singh Mall as Noora / Osama Bin Laden
 Sugandha Garg as Zoya Khan
 Nikhil Ratnaparkhi as Gul
 Piyush Mishra as Majeed Khan
 Rahul Singh as Qureishi Ahmed
 Seema Bhargav as Shabbo
 Barry John as Ted Wood (Ted-ji)
 Chirag Vohra as Lateef Hussain
 Chinmay Mandlekar as Usmaan Khan
 Rajendra Sethi as Jamal Bhai, a travel agent
 Harry Josh as Security guard
 Masood Akhtar as Goga from Rahim Yar Khan
 Sudipto Balav as an ISI agent

Production

Development
Abhishek Sharma was working with Pooja Shetty Deora when he developed the idea of making a film on Osama. According to him, the idea was apparently due to a "severe" headache. "I had a severe headache one day and had tied a cloth around my head, which looked like a turban. I had a lot of facial hair then. Someone commented that I looked like Osama Bin Laden. It then struck me to do a spoof on Bin Laden", he said. He then did research on Osama bin Laden through internet by watching his tapes and prepared the first draft of the film, which was cleared by Pooja Shetty.

Casting
For the film's cast, Sharma didn't want any "established stars or people that are easily recognizable" as the film wouldn't have the "intended effect on audience". Ali Zafar was the first one to be cast. Sharma watched his music videos and decided to give the journalist's role to him as he had the "quirkiness" and "wit" to be in a comedy film. Zafar was initially cautious about the script but decided to do the film after reading the script, which he liked. He prepared for the role by watching and studying reporters and learning how they function. He attended a 10-day workshop with Barry John along with other actors of the film. Pradhuman Singh was selected to play as Osama bin Laden after an "innumerable auditions and a tedious process". The casting of Osama was "a challenge", according to Sharma. Sharma knew Singh since their days together at a workshop in the National School of Drama and according to him, Singh was "good at mimicry". They made a short film and a documentary together after which Sharma shifted to Mumbai. Singh was given an Osama tape to watch, and he later learned Arabic for eight months to get the diction.

Filming
The film crew attempted to get the locations, costume design, and language as similar as possible to that in Pakistan, and recreated the scene of Karachi to do this. The film was shot in areas of Mumbai and Hyderabad which bore resemblance to Karachi. The costumes, hoardings in Urdu, radio sets were brought from Pakistan.

Release
Tere Bin Laden was released on 23 July 2010 in 344 screens across India. It was distributed by BSK Network and Entertainment Private Limited, owned by Boney Kapoor. The release of the film was delayed in the United States because the producers first wanted to gauge the film's response in other countries and also considering the sensitivity of the topic in the US. Pakistan's censor board renamed the title of the movie as Tere Bin as Zafar didn't want the people to think of the film as a biography of Osama bin Laden and Middle East countries banned the release of the film.

Critical reception
The film garnered mixed to positive reviews. Nikhat Kazmi of The Times of India, while giving it a rating of 4 out of 5 noted that "compared with recent laugh riots at box office, Tere Bin Laden has both: a smart script and some smart acting." Noyon Jyoti Parasara of AOL rated the film 4 out of 5 and said, "What makes 'Tere Bin Laden' mint fresh is that despite being based on the post 9/11 scenario and the Laden scare, this one is a fun ride." Taran Adarsh of Bollywood Hungama gave the film a rating of 3.5 out of 5 and said, "On the whole, Tere Bin Laden is a fun-ride that makes you smile constantly and even laugh outrageously in those two hours." Pankaj Sabnani of Bollywood Trade News Network gave it 3.5/5 and stated "Tere Bin Laden is 'laden' with many humorous moments. It is by far the funniest film in recent times. A must watch." Rediff called the film a "brilliant satire". It further said, "Tere Bin Laden is not just a film about slapstick jokes and naughty humour. Through all the gags and jokes, one is forced to accept how willingly we compromise on our ideals and values to attain our cherished goals; how we persist in giving personal gain more importance than building a cohesive society". The film received international media attention too with The Guardian terming the film as a "satire with a sting" and felt that the film "required viewing by the American Government".

NDTV wrote: "Tere Bin Laden is one of those whacked-out satires that sounds far funnier in theory than it finally is on screen". It lauded the director Abhishek Sharma for "pulling off a parody" while combining "poultry jokes with globally-significant comments" which is "no small achievement". Rajeev Masand of CNN-IBN felt that the film "is a low-IQ comedy that succeeds in making you laugh occasionally, despite its highly improbable premise". He said that the "script is over-simplistic in its portrayal of America's cluelessness and confusion over how to deal with the terror threat, and as a result the film's final act comes off as too contrived even for a comedy". Rotten Tomatoes declared that 54% of 368 users liked the film and on an average, rated the film at 3.3 out of a scale of 5.

Political analyst, Jyoti Malhotra in Arab international daily, Asharq Alawsat, saw the film as a "message for Pak–India Talks", referring to foreign ministers of India and Pakistan, who were meeting at the same time. According to her, the film, "promises to unite film-goers...an ingredient terribly dangerous for power-hungry politicians on any side."

Box office
In India, the film opened on 350 screens and collected  50 million in its opening weekend. Friday morning shows opened with 20–25% in key areas like Delhi, Mumbai, Pune, Nasik, Bangalore, and evening settled down to 35–40% with average occupancy cultivating first day gross box office of  11.1 million, with glowing reviews ranging from 3–4 star ratings and strong word of mouth from audience Saturday showed an impressive jump of 80–85% and settle down to  17.5 million, Sunday showed further jump of 66% compared to Saturday, and garnered further  21.5 million cultivating to cumulative an astounding opening weekend collection of more than  50 million gross. The film collected  at the end of its theatrical run. It was declared an average grosser at the box office.

Awards and nominations
6th Apsara Film & Television Producers Guild Awards
Nominated
 Apsara Award for Best Story – Abhishek Sharma
 Apsara Award for Best Screenplay – Abhishek Sharma

2011 Zee Cine Awards
Nominated
 Best Male Debut – Ali Zafar
 Best Comedian – Pradhuman Singh Mall

Soundtrack

The soundtrack of Tere Bin Laden was released on 21 June 2010. The music directors of the film include, Shankar Mahadevan, Ehsaan Noorani, Loy Mendonca and Dhruv Dhalla while the lyrics have been penned by Jaideep Sahni

Controversies
Walkwater Media, the film's production company, reportedly received threatening letters which accused the company of supporting Osama bin Laden and terrorism by making the comedy film.

Pakistan's film censor board banned the film on grounds that extremists could use it as a pretext to launch attacks.

Sequel

In May 2012, it was announced that VJ-turned actor Ayushmann Khurrana will be the lead actor for the sequel. The sequel will also be produced by Pooja Shetty and directed by Abhishek Sharma. Sharma announced that Manish Paul would be playing the lead role in Tere Bin Laden 2, while Pradhuman Singh would return in the sequel and continue portraying the role of Osama bin Laden look-alike. Ali Zafar will also return in the sequel, but only for a cameo appearance apparently.

See also

 List of cultural references to the 11 September attacks

References

External links

 
 

2010 films
2010s Hindi-language films
2010s political comedy films
Films scored by Shankar–Ehsaan–Loy
Indian political comedy films
Indian satirical films
Indian political satire films
Cultural depictions of Osama bin Laden
Film censorship in Pakistan
Film controversies in Pakistan
Films set in Pakistan
Films set in Karachi
Insurgency in Khyber Pakhtunkhwa fiction
Censored films
Military of Pakistan in films
2010 directorial debut films
2010s satirical films
Films set in Khyber Pakhtunkhwa
Films set in Afghanistan
War in Afghanistan (2001–2021) films
Films based on the September 11 attacks
Films about al-Qaeda
Films directed by Abhishek Sharma
Films about illegal immigration to the United States